Anders Kaliff (born 1963) is a Swedish archaeologist. Kaliff has worked as chief of the archaeology department of the Swedish National Heritage Board, and led archaeological excavations throughout Northern Europe and Asia. Since 2008 he has been Professor of Archaeology at Uppsala University. Kaliff is a member of the Royal Gustavus Adolphus Academy and the Nathan Söderblom Society.

Selected works
 Grav och kultplats, 1997
 Gothic Connections, 2001
 Dracula och hans arv, 2009
 Fire, Water, Heaven and Earth, 2011
 Källan på botten av tidens brunn, 2018

References

1963 births
Living people
Archaeologists from Riga
Members of the Royal Gustavus Adolphus Academy
Swedish archaeologists
Academic staff of Uppsala University